Iden Versio is a fictional character in the Star Wars franchise. She is the commander of Inferno Squad, a group of elite Imperial soldiers, who eventually defects to the Rebel Alliance. Iden is the player character of the 2017 video game Star Wars Battlefront II, an action shooter developed by  EA DICE, in collaboration with Criterion Games and Motive Studios. She serves as the main protagonist of the game's single-player campaign, in which she is voiced and portrayed via motion capture by Janina Gavankar.

Development and design

Battlefront IIs campaign narrative and characters, including Iden, were developed by Electronic Arts's Motive Studios branch. Iden Versio is voiced and portrayed through motion capture by actress and musician Janina Gavankar. On the motion capture aspect of her performance, Gavankar commented "The technology has caught up so much that you can deliver a subtle performance and it will catch your micro-expressions [...] I decided to deliver as subtle of a performance as I would on camera.

During her audition process for the game, Gavanakar was not told that the project she was auditioning for was Battlefront II nor that she was auditioning for the lead role, but noted that her knowledge of the gaming industry assisted her in "[putting] two and two together." She commented that "I just got an audition and it said [...] EA Motive. When you send someone like me, who is a hardcore gamer, an audition like this, I knew exactly what it was. I knew that if it was Motive that it was Battlefront." Gavankar commented that the development process for Iden was highly collaborative. She detailed that she "worked with the writers of the game and the writer of the book and we had access to a LucasFilm story group member every day on set. We really found out who [Iden] was together. We worked with military consultants to figure out how we moved together as a squad; all of these things took a lot of care and conversation."

Steve Blank, a creative executive for Lucasfilm described Iden as a "tried and true and through and through Imperial." Gavankar detailed Iden as having an "unshaking loyalty to the Empire" as a result of her early life upbringing to be "the perfect soldier, the perfect officer." She commented that Iden "is a literal poster child for the Empire. Her father is an Admiral and her mother is a propaganda artist. She actually put Iden in posters." Gavankar added that "all the way up until the moment [the player begins Battlefront II], [Iden's] story has been dark, dark, dark side." Despite this, Iden's characterization has been described as "grey" and "complex", due to events that unfold in Battlefront II. VentureBeat details that that complexity drew Gavankar to the role. Gavanakar also detailed that even though Iden defects to the Rebellion, she still misses the order, cleanliness, and respect that the Empire carried itself with.

Appearances

Novels

Iden Versio debuted in Star Wars Battlefront II: Inferno Squad, a tie-in novel for the 2017 Battlefront II video game. The Inferno Squad novel was written by Christie Golden and released on July 25, 2017. Gavankar provided the voice for the novel's audiobook version. The novel's events directly precede those of the video game. In the novel, the "Inferno Squad" is an elite team of soldiers led by Commander Iden Versio. In-universe, the group's formation is authorized by the Empire after the Rebellion steals the plans to the Death Star and destroys the battle station. The Inferno Squad is tasked with infiltrating and eliminating "the Dreamers", who were the remainder of Saw Gerrera's extremist rebel group, the Partisans.

In Inferno Squad, the unit is established with Iden commanding Gideon Hask, a fellow pilot who graduated top of his class at Coruscant Imperial University, Del Meeko, a TIE fighter pilot and an engineering expert, and Seyn Marana, an intelligence prodigy and master cryptologist. Iden is also noted for holding the record for most verified kills in battle. In the novel, Admiral Garrick Versio serves as the squad's supervisor.

Video games

Battlefront II
Iden Versio's first video game appearance was in Star Wars Battlefront II (2017), where she is portrayed by Janina Gavankar. She is the main protagonist of the single-player campaign, and is also a playable character in game's multiplayer mode. The campaign establishes Iden as the Commander of Inferno Squad, an Imperial Special Forces unit. Gavankar also described Inferno Squad as a black ops unit. Her Inferno Squad mates in the game are Gideon Hask and Del Meeko. Throughout the game, Iden Versio is accompanied by ID10, a seeker droid which she nicknames Dio. TJ Ramini, Del Meeko's voice actor, notes that Iden and Del "have a bit of a banter, a bit of a laugh," throughout the game.

After being freed from Rebel captivity by ID10, the player first controls Iden on Endor during the events of Return of the Jedi. Iden leads Inferno Squad against the Rebellion in the Battle of Endor, during which they witness the destruction of the second Death Star. Iden then meets with her father, Admiral Garrick Versio and the two receive orders from a now deceased Emperor Palpatine in the form of a hologram recording. One of Palpatine's posthumous orders is for the Empire to perform Operation: Cinder, which involved devastating many Imperial planets in order to instill fear in the galaxy and emphasize the Empire's authority. One of the planets targeted by Operation: Cinder is Iden's homeworld of Vardos. Inferno Squad is sent to Vardos to retrieve Gleb, an Imperial ally, so that she is not caught in the destruction of Vardos. Iden ideologically disagrees with Operation: Cinder, as it conflicts with Iden's belief that the Empire stands for peace and order. As a result of her internal conflict with Operation: Cinder, Iden disobeys Imperial commands to not rescue civilians, and she defects from the Empire. Del Meeko joins Iden, while Hask remains loyal to the Empire. 

Following her defection from the Empire, the player continues to control Iden, who briefly was unaligned, but soon joins the in-universe Rebellion movement. Toward the end of the game's campaign, Iden participates in the Battle of Jakku, the final large-scale military battle of the in-universe Galactic Civil War. The player controls Iden as she assists the Rebellion in defeating the Empire. During the battle, Iden engages - and bests - Hask in a dogfight and confronts her father on his ship as it is being destroyed by Rebel fire. She pleads with him to follow her to safety, but he refuses and urges her to survive. Following the Rebellion's victory, she begins a romantic relationship with her Inferno Squad partner, Del Meeko. Nearly 30 years pass, and in the campaign's epilogue, it is revealed that Iden and Del have married and had a daughter. The campaign ends with a cliffhanger after Hask, now aligned with the First Order, kills Del.

Battlefront II: Resurrection
Iden returns in the Star Wars Battlefront II: Resurrection downloadable content (DLC). Mitch Dyer, the co-writer of Battlefront II details that "when the Resurrection DLC begins, [...] Iden is in a time of peace. The galaxy is at peace — there is no war." While the initial Battlefront II campaign features chapters in which the player controls other characters like Luke Skywalker or Lando Calrissian, the Resurrection DLC focuses entirely on Iden. Dyer commented that this is because "one of the key pieces of feedback [the development team] got was that people really liked playing as Iden. She's an interesting and compelling new character in the Star Wars universe, so we wanted to really focus the rest of the story on her." 

Resurrection introduces Iden and Del's daughter, Zay. Following Del's disappearance, Iden, Zay, and Shriv Suurgav, Iden's old partner from Inferno Squad, search for him, and stumble upon Project Resurrection, the First Order's operation of abducting children from their homes and indoctrinating them to become stormtroopers. Eventually, the trio learn that Del was killed by Hask. Toward the end of the DLC, while infiltrating Hask's Star Destroyer with Zay and Shriv, Iden steals the plans for a First Order dreadnought and kills Hask, but is mortally wounded in the process. Zay and Shriv manage to escape on a stolen TIE Fighter and send the dreadnought plans to General Leia Organa's Resistance movement. Leia then sends the pair to gather the Resistance's allies in the Outer Rim.

Other games
Versio is mentioned in the 2020 video game Star Wars: Squadrons by the Imperial pilot Havina Vonreg, who expressed spitefulness for Versio's defection to the New Republic.

Versio was added as a playable character to the mobile free-to-play turn-based role-playing game Star Wars: Galaxy of Heroes in January 2022.

Toys
A LEGO minifigure version of Versio is also available in the LEGO Star Wars Inferno Squad Battle Pack, which was released in early 2019. An expansion to Fantasy Flight's Star Wars Legion, includes and Iden Versio miniature and cards to include her in standard play.

Reception
The character of Iden Versio received mixed opinions. In a review of the Inferno Squad novel, Sean Keane of New York Daily News wrote that "We get POV sections from all four members of the squad, but Iden is by far the most developed. She's a great lead and the novel highlights the strengths and weaknesses of the idealized Imperial upbringing. She is a talented soldier, but struggles with emotion and attachment."

In his review of Star Wars Battlefront II, Bryan Bishop of The Verge praised Janina Gavankar's performance, opining that she "delivers some real pathos with her performance." Bishop added, "[Iden] may be an Imperial, but she's also a hero in the classic Star Wars tradition: she fights for the ideals that have been instilled in her from birth, and carries with her the kind of devil-may-care swagger that made Han Solo a household name." Tom Hoggins of The Telegraph wrote that Gavankar joined an "exclusive club of women leading Star Wars stories, with Iden Versio standing alongside Daisy [Ridley]'s Rey and Felicity Jones' Jyn Erso from Rogue One."

In a negative review of Resurrection, Hayden Dingman of PCWorld opines that the setup to the DLC is promising due to the believability of Iden's stakes in comparison with the main campaign and the built-in emotional hook of Del Meeko's death, "compounded by Iden fighting alongside her daughter Zay." Dingman, however, added that "Battlefront IIs campaign, proper ending included, is anemic start to finish. Just so much wasted potential. I don't know whether blame lies with Disney or with EA and DICE, but the developers had an amazing character in Iden Versio and did nothing with her." Samuel Roberts of PC Gamer had similar sentiments, commenting that "most of the tension is removed from the story" once "Iden Versio and her comrade, Del, basically join the Rebellion." Roberts criticized the lack of exploration of Iden's Imperial perspective, commenting that "in the opening, [the player gets] the sense that Iden and company believe in the sense of order that the Empire brings—but their perspective isn't explored with much greater depth than that. When they turn against the Empire, as the Empire turns on its own people, they make the snap decision to change sides with very little ambiguity."

References

Further reading

External links
 
 

Female characters in video games
Fictional female lieutenants
Fictional defectors
Fictional fighter pilots
Fictional revolutionaries
Fictional space pilots
Fictional special forces personnel
Fictional war veterans
Fictional soldiers
Star Wars video game characters
Video game characters introduced in 2017
Video game protagonists
Woman soldier and warrior characters in video games